Francisco Pradilla Ortiz (24 July 1848 – 1 November 1921) was a prolific Spanish painter famous for creating historical scenes.

Biography
He was born in Villanueva de Gállego, in Zaragoza Province and began his studies in Zaragoza. He then transferred to the Real Academia de Bellas Artes de San Fernando and, later, the "Academia de Acuarelistas" (Academy of Watercolorists) in Madrid.

In 1873, he became one of the first students chosen to study at the new . From there he had opportunities to travel to France and  Venice and studied the old masters.

In 1878 he submitted his painting Doña Joanna the Mad or (Juana la Loca) to the National Exhibition of Fine Arts and was awarded the Medal of Honor. In 1879, the Spanish Senate then commissioned him to create La Rendición de Granada (The Surrender of Granada), which took him three years to complete.

He traveled, mostly in Italy, portraying local themes and people. In 1897 he returned to Madrid as the director of the Museo del Prado. He held this position only briefly and then focused again on painting.

His total output is well over 1,000 paintings showing his interest in a variety of subjects and styles, often without regard of the current fashion. He is primarily recognized for his historical paintings; the last one completed in 1910 carries one of the longer titles of a major painting, Cortejo del bautizo del Príncipe Don Juan, hijo de los Reyes Católicos, por las calles de Sevilla (Retinue of the Baptism of Don Juan, son of the Catholic Monarchs, Along the Streets of Seville). An earlier example is The Sigh of the Moor, which depicts Muhammad XII, the last Nasrid ruler of Granada, turning to take his last look at the city from the Puerto del Suspiro del Moro before going into exile.

Much more common, however, are costumbristas—often romanticized studies that show local customs or manners—and landscapes that are often sketchy, with impressionistic influences. Financial duress after the bankruptcy of his bank may have imposed a special need to be productive.

Gallery

References

Sources
 

 Pradilla y Ortiz in the Gran Enciclopedia Aragonesa

External links

1848 births
1921 deaths
19th-century Spanish painters
19th-century Spanish male artists
Spanish male painters
20th-century Spanish painters
20th-century Spanish male artists
Recipients of the Pour le Mérite (civil class)
Directors of the Museo del Prado
History painters
Orientalist painters
People from Zaragoza
Real Academia de Bellas Artes de San Fernando alumni
Spanish genre painters